is a former Japanese football player.

Playing career
Wada was born in Chiba Prefecture on November 28, 1973. After graduating from Senshu University, he joined Japan Football League club Tokyo Gas (later FC Tokyo) in 1996. He played many matches as forward from first season. However he could hardly play in the match for injury in 1998. Although the club was promoted to new league J2 League from 1999, he could not play many matches and retired end of 1999 season.

Club statistics

References

External links

1973 births
Living people
Senshu University alumni
Association football people from Chiba Prefecture
Japanese footballers
J2 League players
Japan Football League (1992–1998) players
FC Tokyo players
Association football forwards